The Peace and Development Party is an Armenian political party in Artsakh.

History
The Peace and Development Party was established on 25 October 2014. Its founder and current party leader is Garik Grigoryan. The party currently has no parliamentary representation within the National Assembly and acts as an extra-parliamentary force.

On 26 November 2016, a political party by the same name also registered itself in Armenia, by political analyst Andrias Ghukasyan. Ghukasyan hoped that both parties would cooperate together. During an interview, Ghukasyan stated, "I think that in the future a joint alliance of the Armenian and Artsakh parties will be formed, which will give an opportunity to have a new political force, which operates jointly in both Artsakh and Armenia." However, Chairman Garik Grigoryan confirmed that the two parties have no connection.

Electoral record
The party did participate in the 2015 Nagorno-Karabakh parliamentary elections, winning just 0.86% of the popular vote and failing to win any seats in the National Assembly. Following the election, the party released a statement criticizing the lack of democracy in the country. The party opted not to participate in the 2020 Artsakhian general election.

Ideology
The party advocates for peace in the Caucasus region, the right for Artsakh citizens to determine their own future, fighting corruption and authoritarianism, and supporting the economic development of Artsakh.

See also

List of political parties in Artsakh
Politics of Artsakh

References

External links
 Peace and Development Party on Facebook

Political parties in the Republic of Artsakh
Political parties established in 2014